The Solothurn Film Festival (SFT) is the most important festival for Swiss film productions. Founded in 1966 in the Swiss city of Solothurn, the annual festival presents a representative selection of Swiss feature, documentary, and short film productions. In a series of public talks and panel discussions, the audience meets with members of the film industry to discuss the screened films and the culture of film in Switzerland. With over 60,000 visitors every year, the Solothurn Film Festival ranks among the most renowned cultural events in the country.

History 

The Solothurn Film Festival ranks among the oldest film festivals in Switzerland and is the most important festival for Swiss film productions. In 1966 the Solothurn Film Guild organized a conference called “Swiss film today.” The aim was to generate new ideas and inspiration for young, independent Swiss filmmakers. From this evolved the association called “Schweizerische Gesellschaft Solothurner Filmtage” (SGSF), which is responsible for organizing the festival.

Although the Solothurn Film Festival has already existed for nearly half a century, there have only been three directors throughout its history: Stephan Portmann was the festival's first director in 1967; in 1987 he was replaced by Ivo Kummer. When Ivo Kummer accepted the position as head of the Film Department for the Swiss Federal Office of Culture (SFOC) as of August 1, 2011, Seraina Rohrer was appointed as his successor.

Between 1998 and 2008, Solothurn hosted the award ceremony of the Swiss Film Prize during the festival. In 2009 the award ceremony was relocated to the  KKL Luzern (Culture and Convention Centre Lucerne). The nominees for the Swiss Film Prize are selected and announced in Solothurn during the festival.

Program

Swiss Panorama 
The "Swiss Panorama" section is the centrepiece of the Solothurn Film Festival. It presents a selection of current Swiss film productions of all genres and lengths from all four linguistic regions of Switzerland. The program reflects the diversity of filmmaking in Switzerland, encompassing documentary, fiction, experimental, short and animation films, as well as music clips.

Rencontre 
Every year the special “Rencontre” program honours an individual whose work has played a significant role in Swiss filmmaking. The program presents a selection of film productions, while also enabling personal encounters. With “Rencontre,” the Solothurn Film Festival offers the opportunity to gain in-depth insight into the works of well-known Swiss cineastes and to meet with them.

Previous honoured individuals:

2014	Peter Liechti

2013	Silvio Soldini

2012	Marthe Keller

2011	Ruth Waldburger

2010	Niki Reiser

2009	Léa Pool

2008	Walo Lüönd

2007	Renato Berta

2006	Maximilian Schell

2005	Bruno Ganz

2004	Jean-Luc Bideau

2003	Pio Corradi

2002	Paul Riniker

2001	T&C Film AG, Marcel Hoehn

2000	Jacqueline Veuve

1999	Alexander J. Seiler

1998	Claude Goretta

1997	Reni Mertens and Walter Marti

1996	Alain Tanner

Focus 
The Focus section addresses topical issues and was presented for the first time at the Solothurn Film Festival in 2012. In Focus 2012, ten films were screened in a program called “Beyond cinema” (Jenseits des Kinos). The films explored the boundaries of classic cinema, examining closely the current audio-visual landscape at home and abroad to discover new narrative styles as well as atypical production and distribution forms. A panel discussion and workshop were also held in conjunction with the Focus program, prompting the exchange between experts and the audience.

The Focus section evolved from the former Invitation section, which was geared to the cultural exchange and collaboration with the neighbouring regions in Europe.

Initially, in the 1960s, individual directors from abroad were invited. By the 1990s entire guest countries were presented in Solothurn.

Supporting program 
The festival's supporting program offers a diverse number of information events, special screenings for children, as well as theme-specific panel discussions and workshops examining issues concerning the Swiss film culture and film industry in collaboration with various Swiss film institutions and film associations. These events address current topics in Swiss film culture and are geared directly to filmmakers and those who take an active interest in film.

One of the festival's signature features is the Film Club panel discussion: international film critics are invited to discuss current Swiss film productions.

Awards & Tributes 
Numerous awards are presented at the Solothurn Film Festival. The awards not only honour filmmakers and their works but also pay tribute to individuals whose work in the Swiss film industry actively contributes to the success of national filmmaking. All award winners are listed on the official Website of the Solothurn Film Festival.

Prix de Soleure - Jury Award 
The Prix de Soleure, endowed with CHF 60,000, was awarded for the first time in 2009. It honours an outstanding Swiss film produced for the cinema with a distinctive humanistic message and impressive cinematic form. The Selection Committee of the Solothurn Film Festival nominates five to ten films every year; a jury, newly comprised every year, decides on the winner of the award.

Previous award-winners:
 
2014“L'escale” by Kaveh Bakthiari

2013	“Der Imker” by Mano Khalil

2012	“Vol special” by Fernand Melgar

2011	“Cleveland contre Wallstreet” by Jean-Stéphane Bron

2010	“Nel giardino dei suoni” by Nicola Bellucci

2009	“No more smoke signals” by Fanny Bräuning

Prix du Public - Audience Award 
The Audience Award has been an integral part of the program of the Solothurn Film Festival since 2007. The audience votes on its favourite from approximately ten film productions screened in the festival's evening program are nominated. The PRIX DU PUBLIC is endowed with CHF 20,000 and awarded by the festival's principal sponsors, Swiss Post and Swiss Life, in collaboration with the Solothurn Film Festival.

Previous award-winners:

2015	Usfahrt Oerlike by Paul Riniker

2014	“Neuland” by Anna Thommen

2013	“More Than Honey” by Markus Imhoof

2012	“Die Wiesenberger” by Bernhard Weber and Martin Schilt

2011	“Sommervögel” by Paul Riniker

2010	“Bödälä – Dance the Rhythm” by Gitta Gsell

2009	“Maman est chez le coiffeur” by Léa Pool

2008	“Das Geheimnis von Murk” by Sabine Boss

2007	“Vitus” by Fredi M. Murer

Prizes for emerging talent 
There are three competitions in conjunction with the “Upcoming” section, which was initiated in 2012 to showcase emerging filmmakers, place new talent in the spotlight and examine current trends.

Upcoming Talent: SUISSIMAGE/SSA – Newcomer Prizes: The SUISSIMAGE/SSA (Swiss Authors’ Rights Cooperative for Audiovisual Works/Society of Swiss Authors) endowed the Newcomer Prize for Best Short Film which was presented by a three-member jury, amounting to CHF 15,000, as well as the Audience Prize for Best Animation Film, amounting to a total of CHF 10,000.
	
Upcoming Music Clips: Jury Prize: The SUISA Foundation for Music presents an award in conjunction with the “Music Clips” program the Jury Prize, endowed with CHF 2,000, presented to the director of an outstanding clip by a jury of experts. 
	
Upcoming Lab: In 2012 the Solothurn Film Festival and SRG SSR, together with the web portals Frischfilm.sf.tv and moncinema.ch searched for the most original 60-second remake of the classic Swiss film production “The Swissmakers.” Approximately 40 filmmakers submitted works which were uploaded on the two portals, and a jury and the audience selected two winners.

Award-winners 2012:

Upcoming Talent: “La Noyée” by Vincent Weber

Upcoming Music Clips: “Hailey Fought the Law” (Blanket) by Piet Baumgartner

Audience Prize SUISSIMAGE/SSA: “Gypaetus Helveticus” by Marcel Barelli (CHF 5,000);  “Bon Voyage” by Fabio Friedli (CHF 3,000); and “Borderline “Dustin Rees” (CHF 2;000).

Upcoming Lab: “Die Schweizermacher” in 60 seconds: “Die Schafmacher” by Thaïs Odermatt (Jury Prize) and “Swiss Maker” by Raphaël Tschudi (Audience Prize).

Award-winners 2013:

Upcoming Talent: “A World for Raúl” by Mauro Mueller

Night of the Nominations 
→ ''Article: Swiss Film Prize

The nominations for the Swiss Film Prize QUARTZ are announced on the Night of the Nominations by the Swiss Federal Office of Culture. During the Solothurn Film Festival members of the Swiss Film Academy, founded in 2008 by the film industry associations and presided over by film director Christian Frei, view the submitted films in the Academy Lounge or in the festival cinemas and submit the names of their nominees via secret ballot. The nominees (in nine categories) are announced on the “Night of the Nominations.”

The award ceremony was held in Solothurn until 2009. Since then it has been held, about two months after the Solothurn Film Festival, in the KKL Luzern (Culture and Convention Centre Lucerne) in collaboration with SRG SSR, the Swiss Federal Office of Culture, SWISS FILMS and the Swiss Film Academy.

Prix Pathé - Film Critic Prize 
The “Prix Pathé - Film Critic Prize” honours film critics for outstanding contributions to current Swiss film productions. Since 2010 the Prix Pathé has been awarded in both the “Print Media” category and in the “Electronic Media” category, each of which are endowed with CHF 10,000. Benefactors of the prize are Pathé Schweiz and Pathé Films AG.

Previous prize-winners – Print Media

2014	Mathieu Loewer for his dossier on the film "L'expérience Blocher" by Jean-Stéphane Bron (Le Courrier, 14.8.2013).

2013	Florian Keller for his contribution "Ein Land von Schissfilmern" (Das Magazin, 14.1.2012).

2012	Flurin Fischer for his film critique “Godards göttliche Komödie” on the film “Film Socialisme” by Jean-Luc Godard (Bündner Tagblatt, 3.12 2010).

2011	Christian Jungen for his critique “Bitte mehr Mut und Haltung” (NZZ am Sonntag, 17.1.2010).

2010	Christoph Egger for his film critique “Ein kurzer Sommer der Anarchie” on the film “Home” by Ursula Meier (NZZ, 19.2.2009).

2009	Martin Walder for his film critique “Szenen einer Ehe” on the film “Giorni e nuvole” by Silvio Soldini (NZZ am Sonntag, 30.3.2008).

2008	Matthias Lerf for his film critique “Jenseits und todlustig” on the film “Sieben Mulden und eine Leiche” by Thomas Haemmerli (Sonntags Zeitung, 25.3.2007).

2007	Alexandra Stäheli for her Filmbesprechung “Edelmiezen erstarren im Design” on the film “Nachbeben” by Stina Werenfels (NZZ, 3.3.2006).

2006	Antoine Duplan for his article “Regarder la mort en face” on the film “Exit” by Fernand Melgar (L’Hebdo, 1.9.2005).

Previous prize-winners - Electronic Media:

2014	Vincent Kucholl and Vincent Veillon for their satiric contribution on Swiss films ("120 secondes", Couleur 3, 25.01.2013 und 24.05.2013).

2013	Lisa Röösli for her TV-Beitrag "Thorberg" on the film "Thorberg" by Dieter Fahrer ("Kulturplatz", SRF1, 29.8.2012).
 
2012	Brigitte Häring for her Radio-Beitrag “Filmischer Einblick ins Teenie-Dasein” on the films “Romans d’ados” by Béatrice Bakhti and “Mit dem Bauch durch die Wand” by Anka Schmid (“Reflexe” program on DRS2, 1.2.2011).

2011	Daniel Hürlimann (1968 – 2011) for his Radio-Beitrag on the filming of “Lionel” by Mohammed Soudani (“Geronimo” program on Radio Svizzera Rete Due, 11.12.2009).

2010	Michael Sennhauser for his film critique “Maman est chez le coiffeur” by Léa Pool (DRS2 aktuell, 8.4.2009).

Prix d'honneur 
The «Prix d'honneur» (founded by the Wasseramt Communities) honours a Swiss professional in the industry whose achievements have made an outstanding contribution to the Swiss film culture. The prize has been awarded since 2002 and is endowed with CHF 10,000. The decision is based on a proposal submitted by the Selection Committee of the Solothurn Film Festival.

Previous prize-winners:

2014	Martine Felber, makeup artist

2013	Beki Probst, Bernese cinema operator and head of European Film Markets, Berlinale

2012	Christian Schocher, director and cinema operator

2011	Françoise Deriaz, editor-in-chief Ciné-Bulletin

2010	Carlo Varini, cinematographer

2009	Ilona Stamm, distributor Stamm Film

2008	Mathias Kälin, cinematographer

2007	David Streiff, cultural administration

2006	Renato Berta, cinematographer

2005	Freddy Buache, intermediary of Swiss films as filmmaker and critic

2004	Hugues Ryffel, cinematographer

2003	Erich Langjahr, screenwriter, director, cinematographer, producer and distributor

Swiss Television Award 
The Swiss Television Award honours Swiss actors for the Best Leading Role and the Best Supporting Role in a Swiss television production. The award in each of the four categories is endowed with CHF 10,000. The award is endowed by SWISSPERFORM and presented by a jury of representatives from SWISSPERFORM and the Solothurn Film Festival.

The Swiss Television Award was established in 2001 and awarded at the Solothurn Film Festival for the second time in 2012.

Previous award-winners:

2012
Lea Hadorn (leading female role in “Liebe und andere Unfälle”)

Roland Vouilloz (leading male role in the CROM series)

Marina Golovine (supporting female role in the CROM series)

Peter Wyssbrod (supporting male role in “Mord hinterm Vorhang”)

2011
Markus Fischer (Snakefilm GmbH) and Stefan Jäger for the film “Hunkeler und der Fall Livius”

Organisation

Schweizerische Gesellschaft Solothurner Filmtage SGSF 
The "Schweizerische Gesellschaft Solothurner Filmtage" (SGSF) is the sponsoring organisation of the Solothurn Film Festival. This non-profit, politically and denominationally neutral association was founded in 1967 and is based in Solothurn. It is responsible for organising the Solothurn Film Festival and increasing public awareness of Swiss film productions. Some 580 members belong to the “Schweizerische Gesellschaft Solothurner Filmtage.”

Selection committee 
The selection committee has four representatives from the Solothurn Film Festival and four external experts from the film industry. The latter are newly appointed every two years and, when possible, come from all four linguistic regions of Switzerland. The selection committee is presided over by the director of the Solothurn Film Festival and is responsible for selecting the films screened in the Swiss Panorama programme.

References

External links 
 Website Solothurn Film Festival
 Facebook-Page of the Solothurn Film Festival
 Twitter-Channel of the Solothurn Film Festival

Film festivals in Switzerland
Solothurn
Tourist attractions in the canton of Solothurn
Film festivals established in 1966